The 14th AARP Movies for Grownups Awards, presented by AARP the Magazine, honored films released in 2014 made by and for people over the age of 50. The awards were announced by the magazine on January 10, 2015, with the winners recognized at a ceremony hosted by John Leguizamo at the Beverly Wilshire Hotel on February 2. Israel Horovitz won the award for Breakthrough Achievement for his directorial debut, My Old Lady, and Kevin Costner won the Career Achievement Award.

Awards

Winners and nominees

Winners are listed first, highlighted in boldface, and indicated with a double dagger.

Breakthrough Achievement
 Israel Horovitz: "A less confident first-timer might have balked at taking on Maggie Smith, Kevin Kline, and Kristin Scott Thomas, but Horovitz attacks the task like a veteran, managing to delicately balance strong performances by three of the screen's most accomplished actors."

We Also Loved
 Jon Stewart's debut, Rosewater

Career Achievement Award
 Kevin Costner

Films with multiple nominations

References

AARP Movies for Grownups Awards
AARP